Internatsionalnoye may refer to the following places:

Places
Kazakhstan
Internatsionalnoye, Akmola Region
Internatsionalnoye, Jambyl Region
Internatsionalnoye, North Kazakhstan Region